Todd Blanchfield (born 7 November 1991) is an Australian professional basketball player for the Perth Wildcats of the National Basketball League (NBL). He began his NBL career in 2009 with the Townsville Crocodiles, where he played six seasons. Between 2015 and 2020, he played for Melbourne United (2015–17), Sydney Kings (2017–18) and Illawarra Hawks (2018–20). In 2017, he won a gold medal with Australia at the FIBA Asia Cup.

Early life
Born and raised in Mackay, Queensland, Blanchfield attended Mackay State High School and played for representative teams of Mackay Basketball Association. In January 2008, he travelled to the United States on an Australian schoolboys tour of North Carolina.

Professional career

NBL

Townsville Crocodiles (2009–2015)
In July 2009, Blanchfield signed with the Townsville Crocodiles of the National Basketball League. He appeared in 10 games during the 2009–10 season as a development player.

In June 2010, Blanchfield signed a three-year contract with the Crocodiles. In 27 games during the 2010–11 season, he averaged 2.6 points and 1.5 rebounds per game. In 31 games during the 2011–12 season, he averaged 7.2 points and 3.3 rebounds per game.

In May 2012, Blanchfield signed a two-year extension to remain under contract with the Crocodiles through the 2014–15 season.

In 2012–13, Blanchfield averaged 9.4 points and 4.1 rebounds in 28 games. He went on to average 11.0 points, 5.3 rebounds and 1.5 assists in 28 games during the 2013–14 season.

In 2014–15, Blanchfield earned NBL Player of the Week honours twice. He was named the NBL's Most Improved Player and earned All-NBL Second Team honours. In 28 games, he averaged 14.6 points, 6.0 rebounds and 1.7 assists per game.

Melbourne United (2015–2017)
On 22 May 2015, Blanchfield signed a two-year deal with Melbourne United. In his debut for United on 9 October 2015 in the team's season opener, Blanchfield scored a career-high 29 points with seven 3-pointers in a 99–84 win over the Crocodiles. He went on to help United earn the minor premiership after finishing the regular season in first place with an 18–10 record. However, in their semi-final series against the fourth-seeded New Zealand Breakers, United were swept 2–0 to bow out of the playoffs. Blanchfield appeared in all 30 games for United in 2015–16, averaging 9.6 points and 6.5 rebounds per game.

On 16 October 2016, in United's fourth game of the 2016–17 season, Blanchfield hit eight 3-pointers and scored 27 points on 9-of-11 shooting in a 95–83 win over the Illawarra Hawks. He later missed three weeks with a groin injury. For the season, he averaged 8.8 points, 3.9 rebounds and 1.0 steals in 22 games.

Sydney Kings (2017–2018)
On 24 March 2017, Blanchfield signed a two-year deal with the Sydney Kings. On 8 May 2018, he was released by the Kings per his request. In his lone season with Sydney, Blanchfield averaged 9.1 points and 4.0 rebounds per game on 33.3% shooting from beyond the arc.

Illawarra Hawks (2018–2020)
On 11 May 2018, Blanchfield signed a three-year deal with the Illawarra Hawks. On 6 January 2020, he scored a career-high 35 points in a 102–96 loss to the Adelaide 36ers. He won his second successive Hawks MVP award in 2019–20 while averaging 13 points and four rebounds per game.

Blanchfield became a free agent following the 2019–20 season following an ownership change at the Hawks.

Perth Wildcats (2020–present)
On 20 July 2020, Blanchfield signed a two-year contract with the Perth Wildcats. In game one of the Wildcats' semi-final series against the Illawarra Hawks on 10 June 2021, they lost 74–72 despite a game-high 24 points from Blanchfield. After winning game two 79–71, Blanchfield scored 21 of his 24 points in the first half of the Wildcats' 79–71 win in game three to clinch the series 2–1. In game one of the grand final series against Melbourne United, the Wildcats lost 73–70 despite a game-high 27 points from Blanchfield. They went on to lose the series 3–0.

On 21 September 2021, Blanchfield was sidelined for three to four months after undergoing surgery to repair damaged cartilage in his left knee. He returned from injury in mid December, but in just his second game of the season, he re-injured his left knee. He was subsequently ruled out for a further three to four weeks. On 6 March 2022, he scored 17 of his season-high 22 points in the first quarter of the Wildcats' 92–73 win over the Adelaide 36ers.

On 27 May 2022, Blanchfield re-signed with the Wildcats on a three-year deal. He played his 350th NBL game in October 2022.

QBL, SEABL and New Zealand NBL
In 2007, Blanchfield played his first season with the Mackay Meteors in QBL, where he was a valuable member of the team despite being just 15 years old. He moved to Canberra in 2008 and played in the SEABL for the AIS, where he averaged five points and two rebounds in 12 games. He returned to the Meteors in 2009 and averaged 20.6 points, 7.7 rebounds and 2.1 assists per game. With the Meteors in 2010, he averaged 18.7 points, 6.4 rebounds and 1.5 assists in 21 games.

In 2011, Blanchfield played for the Townsville Heat. He averaged 18.4 points, 4.7 rebounds and 1.6 assists in 18 games, and was named in the QBL All-League Team. With the Heat in 2012, he earned QBL All-League Team honours for the second straight year after averaging 19.7 points, 7.4 rebounds, 1.8 assists and 1.8 steals in 13 games. With the Heat in 2013, he averaged 17.0 points, 8.0 rebounds and 1.5 assists in 13 games.

Blanchfield returned to the Meteors in 2014 and helped them reach the grand final. He earned QBL All-League Team honours for the third time in four years. In 18 games, he averaged 19.3 points, 8.9 rebounds, 2.8 assists and 1.1 steals per game.

On 9 January 2015, Blanchfield signed with the Southland Sharks as an import for the 2015 New Zealand NBL season. He scored a game-high 28 points in his debut for the Sharks. He later earned NBL Player of the Week honours for round eight and led the Sharks to victory in the grand final with a game-high 23 points and 14 rebounds in a 72–68 win over the Wellington Saints. For the season, he earned NBL All-Star Five honours. In 20 games, he averaged 21.1 points, 7.0 rebounds, 1.1 assists and 1.3 steals per game.

In 2017, Blanchfield played with the Townsville Heat as a short-term injury replacement for Jamell Anderson.

In 2018, Blanchfield returned to the Meteors and averaged 21 points, 10 rebounds and 4.3 assists on 47% shooting, which saw him voted league MVP and a member of the QBL All-League Team.

On 18 March 2019, Blanchfield signed with the Southland Sharks for the 2019 New Zealand NBL season, returning to the team for a second stint. In 19 games, he averaged 16.6 points, 6.0 rebounds, 1.8 assists and 1.3 steals per game.

Blanchfield was set to play for the Rockhampton Rockets in the NBL1 North in 2020, but the season was cancelled due to the COVID-19 pandemic. He re-joined Rockhampton in 2022.

National team career
In 2008, Blanchfield earned selection for the under 19 Australian Emus squad. He helped the Emus defeat the United States to claim bronze at the Albert Schweitzer Tournament in Germany. Later that year, helped the Emus claim bronze at the William Jones Cup in Taiwan.

In 2012, Blanchfield played for Australia at the Stanković Cup, where he won a silver medal. In 2013, he played for Australia at the Stanković Cup and the World University Games, where he won gold and silver respectively.

In 2017, Blanchfield won a gold medal with Australia at the FIBA Asia Cup.

In June 2022, Blanchfield was named in the Boomers' World Cup Qualifiers team.

References

External links

NBL player profile
Melbourne United player profile
QBL player profile
"Take 40: Todd Blanchfield" at nbl.com.au
"Doing the hard yards" at nbl.com.au

1991 births
Living people
Australian expatriate sportspeople in New Zealand
Australian Institute of Sport basketball players
Australian men's basketball players
Illawarra Hawks players
Medalists at the 2013 Summer Universiade
Melbourne United players
Perth Wildcats players
Shooting guards
Small forwards
Southland Sharks players
Sportsmen from Queensland
Sportspeople from Mackay, Queensland
Sydney Kings players
Townsville Crocodiles players
Universiade medalists in basketball
Universiade silver medalists for Australia